Know by Heart is the American Analog Set's fourth studio album.  It was released on September 4, 2001, and was their first album on Tiger Style Records. The song "The Postman" contains vocals by guest Ben Gibbard of Death Cab for Cutie and the Postal Service. Gibbard later covered the song "Choir Vandals" on Home, Vol. 5, a split EP with the American Analog Set's own Andrew Kenny.  "Gone To Earth" first appeared on AmAnSet's 1996 album The Fun of Watching Fireworks.  "Aaron & Maria" was included in an issue of CMJ New Music Monthly in 2002.

In 2009, "Gone To Earth' was used in the film The Time Traveler's Wife.

Track listing

References

2001 albums
The American Analog Set albums